Rama Saraswati was 16th century poet from Kamrup, India. He was well known for translation of entire Mahabharata to Early Assamese from Sanskrit for which he is also known as Axom Byas.

See also
 Bhattadeva
 Hema Saraswati

References

Kamrupi poets
16th-century Indian poets
Indian male poets